The Nightingale Pledge, named in honour of Florence Nightingale, is a modified version of the Hippocratic Oath. Lystra Gretter and a Committee for the Farrand Training School Grace for Nurses in Detroit, Michigan created the pledge in 1893. Gretter, inspired by the work of Nightingale, the founder of modern nursing, credited the pledge to the work of her committee, but was herself considered "the moving spirit behind the idea" for the pledge.

The Nightingale Pledge is a statement of the ethics and principles of the nursing profession in the United States, and it is not used outside the US. It included a vow to "abstain from whatever is deleterious and mischievous" and to "zealously seek to nurse those who are ill wherever they may be and whenever they are in need." In a 1935 revision to the pledge, Gretter widened the role of the nurse by including an oath to become a "missioner of health" dedicated to the advancement of "human welfare"—an expansion of nurses' bedside focus to an approach that encompassed public health.

US nurses have recited the pledge at pinning ceremonies for decades. In recent years, many US nursing schools have made changes to the original or 1935 versions, often removing the "loyalty to physicians" phrasing to promote a more independent nursing profession, with its own particular ethical standards.

Versions 

Original "Florence Nightingale Pledge":

1935 revised version (changes from original italicized):

"Practical Nurse Pledge", a modern version based on the "Nightingale Pledge":

See also 
 Veterinarian's Oath

References 

Nursing
Florence Nightingale